Agdistis cappadociensis is a moth of the family Pterophoridae. It is found in Turkey (including the Sivas Province). The habitat consists of heavily pastured steppe interspersed with ploughed fields. Plants recorded on the site are Crataegus, Allium and Dianthus species.

The wingspan is about 22 mm. The ground colour of the forewings is brown with a slightly paler central area. There is a scattering of brown scales along the costal and dorsal areas. The fringe is unicolourous light brown-grey. The hindwings are light brown-grey. Adults have been recorded in May.

References

Moths described in 2000
Agdistinae
Endemic fauna of Turkey